Grant Chalmers (born 12 September 1969) is a retired Guernsey professional footballer who played as a midfielder in the Football League for Brentford. He represented Guernsey at international level and later served as assistant manager at Northerners. He began cycling competitively in 2007 and together with teammate Aaron Bailey, won the unlicensed category at the 2009 Duo Normand.

Career statistics

References

Living people
1969 births
Guernsey footballers
English footballers
Association football midfielders
English Football League players
Brentford F.C. players
Doncaster Rovers F.C. players